is a Quasi-National Park on the coast of Kōchi Prefecture and Tokushima Prefecture, Japan.

See also

 List of national parks of Japan

References

National parks of Japan
Parks and gardens in Kōchi Prefecture
Parks and gardens in Tokushima Prefecture
Protected areas established in 1964